The R433 road is a regional road in Ireland linking Templemore, County Tipperary and Abbeyleix, County Laois.  It passes through the village of Clonmore, County Tipperary and Errill, County Laois and the towns of Rathdowney and Ballycolla, between which it forms junction 3 of the M8 Cork-Dublin motorway before terminating at Abbeyleix.

See also
Roads in Ireland
National primary road
National secondary road

References
Roads Act 1993 (Classification of Regional Roads) Order 2006 – Department of Transport

Regional roads in the Republic of Ireland
Roads in County Laois
Roads in County Tipperary